Amanda Davis (February 28, 1971March 14, 2003) was an American writer and teacher who died in a plane accident.

Early life 
Amanda Davis was born on February 28, 1971, in Durham, North Carolina. Davis graduated from Charles E. Jordan High School and received a B.A. in theatre at Wesleyan University as well as a M.F.A. in fiction at Brooklyn College.

Career 
In 1999, Davis published a series of short stories called Circling the Drain. The collection was reviewed in various newspapers including The New York Times and Los Angeles Times as well as the website Salon. In the Los Angeles Times, critic Mark Rozzo wrote, "At their best, Davis' stories are potent miniatures about the weird demands that uncertainty and inevitability place upon people, mostly young women linked to men or situations seemingly beyond their control."

Davis' short story, "Louisiana Loses Its Cricket Hum", was featured in the 2001 edition of Best New American Voices. Four days prior to her death, Davis interviewed with Dawn Dreyer of Indy Week regarding her life and career. Furthermore, according to Michael Chabon, Davis planned to write a second novel, either a historical novel about "early Jewish immigrants to the South" or a "creepy modern gothic".

Outside of writing, Davis taught undergraduate and graduate fiction at Mills College.

Personal life 
Davis was Jewish. She had one brother, Adam, and one sister, Joanna.

Death 
On March 14, 2003, while touring for her first novel, Wonder When You′ll Miss Me, Davis was in a Cessna 177 Cardinal being piloted by her father, James Davis. 18 miles from the Asheville Regional Airport, the plane crashed on Old Fort Mountain in McDowell County, North Carolina, killing Davis and her parents. After her death, several writers paid respects for her, including Heidi Julavits for Poets & Writers Magazine and others on McSweeney's, the same site where Davis' work previously appeared.

Legacy 
In honor of Davis' life, McSweeney's introduced an award called the "Amanda Davis Highwire Fiction Award" in 2004, which awarded women writers 32 years old or younger who embodied "Amanda’s personal strengths—warmth, generosity, a passion for community—and who needs some time to finish a book in progress".

References

External links
Wonder When You'll Miss Me
ASF Accident Details

American women novelists
American women short story writers
21st-century American novelists
21st-century American short story writers
21st-century American women writers
Jewish American novelists
Jewish American short story writers
Victims of aviation accidents or incidents in the United States
Accidental deaths in North Carolina
1971 births
2003 deaths
Brooklyn College alumni
Wesleyan University alumni
People from Durham, North Carolina
Writers from Durham, North Carolina
Novelists from North Carolina
20th-century American women
20th-century American people
20th-century American Jews
21st-century American Jews